The Association for Public Policy Analysis and Management (APPAM) is an American organization whose focus is improving public policy and management by fostering excellence in research, analysis, and education. APPAM founded the Journal of Policy Analysis and Management (JPAM) in 1981.

See also
Policy studies

References

External links 
 
 The Hoover Digest
 Global Public Policy Institute
 Association Journal: Journal of Policy Analysis and Management

Policy
Public policy research